is a Japanese footballer currently playing as a midfielder for Albirex Niigata (S).

Career

Albirex Niigata (S) 
Sugita join the White Swans after graduation.

Balestier Khalsa 
After a year in Singapore, he moved to Balestier Khalsa.

Career statistics

Club
.

Notes

References

1999 births
Living people
Association football people from Aichi Prefecture
Waseda University alumni
Japanese footballers
Japan youth international footballers
Japanese expatriate footballers
Association football midfielders
Nagoya Grampus players
Albirex Niigata Singapore FC players
Japanese expatriate sportspeople in Singapore
Expatriate footballers in Singapore